Oleh Tarasenko (born 23 June 1990) is a Ukrainian professional footballer who plays as a defender for FC LNZ Cherkasy.

References

External links
Website Karpaty Profile
Profile on EUFO
Profile on Football Squads

1990 births
Living people
Ukrainian footballers
Ukrainian expatriate footballers
Association football defenders
FC Khodak Cherkasy players
FC Cherkashchyna players
FC Karpaty Lviv players
FC Bukovyna Chernivtsi players
OKS Stomil Olsztyn players
FC LNZ Cherkasy players
Ukrainian Second League players
Ukrainian Premier League players
Ukrainian First League players
I liga players
Expatriate footballers in Poland
Expatriate footballers in Latvia
Ukrainian expatriate sportspeople in Poland
Ukrainian expatriate sportspeople in Latvia
Sportspeople from Cherkasy